Studies in History is a peer-reviewed journal that provides a forum to discuss the considerable expansion and diversification that has occurred in historical research in India in recent years.

It is published twice in a year by SAGE Publications in association with Jawaharlal Nehru University, New Delhi

Abstracting and indexing 
Studies in History is abstracted and indexed in:
 DeepDyve
 SCOPUS
 Portico
 Dutch-KB
 Pro-Quest-RSP
 Worldwide Political Science Abstracts - ProQuest
 Thomson Reuters: Emerging Sources Citation Index (ESCI)
 EBSCO
 ICI
 J-Gate
 OCLC
 Sociological Abstracts – ProQuest
 Bibliography of Asian Studies (BAS)

References
 http://www.jnu.ac.in/

External links
 
 Homepage

SAGE Publishing academic journals
Biannual journals
History journals
Publications established in 1985